The Hong Kong Film Award for Best Visual Effects is an award presented annually at the Hong Kong Film Awards for a film with the best visual effects. As of 2016 the current winners are Jason H. Snell, Ellen Poon and Bingbing Tang for Monster Hunt.

Winners and nominees

References

External links
 Hong Kong Film Awards Official Site

Hong Kong Film Awards